Nanlian station is a station of Line 3, Shenzhen Metro, in China. It opened on 28 December 2010

Station layout

Exits

References

External links
 Shenzhen Metro Nanlian Station (Chinese)
 Shenzhen Metro Nanlian Station (English)

Railway stations in Guangdong
Shenzhen Metro stations
Longgang District, Shenzhen
Railway stations in China opened in 2010